Engage Education Foundation or 'Engage' is an Australia-based not for profit organisation that works to reduce educational inequality by providing high quality educational resources to all students. Founded in 2010, the organisation is run by young people aged 18 to 25, and overseen by an advisory board.

Engage partners with various charitable associations, to support quality educational opportunities for senior secondary school students. Their programs include subject revision seminars attended by 7000 students annually and the recently launched free Engage Wiki. The Engage Wiki is an online educational resource that was launched in 2015 and provides explanatory videos, notes and practice exams across a range of VCE subjects.

History 
Founded in 2010 by students from The University of Melbourne, Engage Education initially ran VCE revision lectures and tutoring. Since then, Engage has entered the field of digital education. All of its services now use the digital education revolution as a means to reduce the barriers to accessible education.

Statement of Purpose 
 To lead young people in realising their full potential.
 To develop and deliver highly effective education programs.
 To create equality in educational opportunities 
 To increase the accessibility of high-quality education through digital resources and programs

Programs

Engage Wiki 
The Engage Wiki is an online educational initiative that launched in 2015. The website provides explanatory videos, notes and exams in a range of VCE subjects. In 2015, Engage's free practice exams registered 120,000 unique downloads.

VCE Lectures 
In July and September, annually, Engage runs VCE revision lectures at The University of Melbourne.

References

External links
 

Educational charities based in Australia
Non-profit organisations based in Victoria (Australia)